Victorian Touring Coaches is a bus and coach charter operator in Melbourne, Victoria, Australia. In 2021, they were acquired by Nuline Charter

History
In 1950, Bill Armstrong purchased Beauty Tourist Co from Sid Horne and renamed it SW Armstrong. The depot in Victoria Street, Brunswick. In 1965, Armstrong acquired part of Green Bus Lines of Malvern, but did not retain the Green Bus Lines names, instead continuing to trade as SW Armstrong. In 2000, the business was rebranded Victorian Touring Coaches. In 2016 the depot was relocated from Moorabbin to Springvale.And after the Nuline acquisition, they operate out of Moorabbin, Clayton and Spotswood

Fleet
As at March 2020, the fleet consisted of 37 buses and coaches. The fleet livery is navy blue and white.

References

External links
Company website

Bus companies of Victoria (Australia)
Bus transport in Melbourne
Transport companies established in 1950
Australian companies established in 1950
2021 mergers and acquisitions